Miroslav Stefanov Kirov is a Bulgarian freestyle wrestler. He won the silver medal in the men's 74 kg event at the 2021 European Wrestling Championships held in Warsaw, Poland.

He competed in the 74kg event at the 2022 World Wrestling Championships held in Belgrade, Serbia.

Achievements

References

External links 
 

Living people
Place of birth missing (living people)
Bulgarian male sport wrestlers
European Wrestling Championships medalists
European Games competitors for Bulgaria
Wrestlers at the 2015 European Games
Wrestlers at the 2019 European Games
21st-century Bulgarian people
1991 births